The Mitre  is a  mountain summit located in the Lake Louise area of Banff National Park, in the Canadian Rockies of Alberta, Canada. Its nearest higher peak is Mount Lefroy,  to the west.

History

The Mitre was named in 1893 by Samuel E.S. Allen presumably because the mountain resembles a Bishop's mitre.

The first ascent of the peak was made in 1901 by Christian Kaufmann, J. Pollinger, G. Collier, E. Tewes, and G. Bohren.

The mountain's name was officially adopted in 1952 by the Geographical Names Board of Canada.

Geology

Like other mountains in Banff Park, The Mitre is composed of sedimentary rock laid down during the Precambrian to Jurassic periods. Formed in shallow seas, this sedimentary rock was pushed east and over the top of younger rock during the Laramide orogeny.

Climate

Based on the Köppen climate classification, The Mitre is located in a subarctic climate zone with cold, snowy winters, and mild summers.

References

See also
 Geography of Alberta

External links
 Parks Canada web site: Banff National Park
 The Metre weather: Mountain Forecast

Two-thousanders of Alberta
Mountains of Banff National Park
Canadian Rockies